The Juno Award for Single of the Year has been awarded since 1974 for the best single in Canada.  It has also been known as Best Single and Best Selling Single. The award goes to the artist.

Best Single (1974)

Best Selling Single (1975 - 1979)

Single of the Year (1980 - 1998)

Best Single (1999 - 2002)

Single of the Year (2003 - present)

See also

Music of Canada

References

Single